The list of by-elections in the Province of Canada includes every by-election held in the Province of Canada from its creation in 1841 until Confederation in 1867. By-elections occurred whenever there was a vacancy in the  Legislative Assembly. The Legislative Council was made an elective body in 1856 and by-elections occurred there as well. Due to the fluid nature of party allegiances during this time no attempt has been made to show them in this list.

Causes
A by-election occurs whenever there was a vacancy in the legislature. Vacancies occurred for the following reasons:

 Death of a member. 
 Resignation of a member. 
 Voided results 
 Expulsion from the legislature. 
 Ineligibility to sit.
 Appointment to the Legislative Council, the appointed upper house, which was made elective in 1856.
 Ministerial by-elections occurred when incumbent members recontested their seats upon being appointed to the Executive Council. In 1853 this requirement was amended to exempt Executive Councillors who resigned their offices and within a month accepted a new office. Solicitors General were not exempted if they switched to the Attorney Generalship. In 1855 this exception was dropped. In 1857 this requirement was extended to include Legislative Councillors.

8th Parliament of the Province of Canada 1863-1867

7th Parliament of the Province of Canada 1861-1863

6th Parliament of the Province of Canada 1858-1861

* Incumbents sat for Quebec City which was a three-member seat until 1860 when it was split into Centre, East and West districts. As a result, the by-elections were held for the new single-member seats

** Members of the Brown-Dorion Ministry of August 2–4, 1858

5th Parliament of the Province of Canada 1854-1857

4th Parliament of the Province of Canada 1851-1854

3rd Parliament of the Province of Canada 1848-1851

2nd Parliament of the Province of Canada 1844-1847

1st Parliament of the Province of Canada 1841-1844

Legislative Council By-Elections 1856-1867
The Legislative Council became an elective body in 1856. By-elections were held to fill vacancies. In 1857 Legislative Councillors appointed to office were now required to seek re-election at Ministerial by-elections.

References

http://www.assnat.qc.ca/en/patrimoine/chronologie/index.html
 
 
 Forman, Debra Legislators and Legislatures of Ontario: A Reference Guide. Legislative Library of Ontario Research and Information Services, 1984

See also 

 List of Joint Premiers of the Province of Canada
 List of elections in the Province of Canada
 List of Canadian federal general elections
 List of Ontario general elections
 List of Quebec general elections
 Legislative Assembly of the Province of Canada

Province of Canada
Lists of elections in Canada